Summerville High School is a public high school in Summerville, South Carolina.

History 
Until the 1960s, a brick building on Main Street, which is now Rollings Middle School of the Arts, was the only high school in the Summerville area. As Summerville's population increased rapidly in the late 1960s and early 1970s, a larger campus was needed. In 1969, the present building on Boone Hill Road was opened to students. From the first day of classes, the new facility was too small. Because of the unexpectedly high enrollment, several mobile units were set up on the campus.

In 1970, Summerville High School and Alston High School were combined to integrate the school district. Attendance continued to increase throughout the 1970s. In 1972, double sessions were used until an additional underclassman campus was completed in 1975. Another classroom wing was created by the spring of 1978.

In 1992, Fort Dorchester High School was opened, splitting the school's student body. As a result, the Gregg underclassman campus was renovated as a middle school, and the switch to a single campus was completed in 1998. Construction of a fine arts hall and cafeteria expansion was completed in the fall of 2001.

In 2008, Ashley Ridge High School was opened to further ease congestion in the Dorchester District Two school system. When attendance zones were realigned for the opening of the new high school, the Ashley Ridge zone contained mostly students who would have attended Summerville high school, whereas only a small portion of the Fort Dorchester attendance zone was diverted.

Statistics 
As of 2004, Summerville has a 78.9% graduation rate. However, the school boasts a 97.3% passing rate of the state's standardized exit exam.

Athletics 
Wrestling

The Green Wave won five state championships between 1979 and 1993. In total, Summerville wrestling has won 12 state championships (1981, 1987, 1988, 1992, 1993, 1998, 2001, 2002, 2004, 2005, 2006, 2008). The program has several high school All-Americans, an NCWA national champion, a JuCo national champion, three NCAA All-Americans, an NCAA national champion, a USA Wrestling national assistant coach of the year, and a USA Wrestling man of the year.

Football

The team has won 12 state championships. The Green Wave won the State Championship in 1998. John McKissick was the coach from 1952 to 2014. His 621 wins is the most by any coach at any level. 

Baseball

Summerville has won a total of five 4A baseball state championships. Their most recent championship was won in 2016.

Swimming

Summerville swimming has a total of 4 state championships, 2 girls (2000, 2001) and 2 boys (2003, 2004).

Track and field

In 2010, the girls' team was the 4A state runner-up team. In 2011, the Lady Green Wave won the state meet. In 1985, one student achieved All-American status. A world ranking in the Decathlon and was named the University of South Carolina's track athlete of the decade for the 1980s.

Soccer

In 1996, the girls' team won the state 4A State Championships.

Marching band
The Summerville Marching Band (SHSCPE) is a six-time South Carolina state champion, winning most recently in 2014.

Notable alumni 
 Christopher Celiz, Medal of Honor recipient
 Walter Bailey, lawyer
 Zack Bailey, NFL offensive lineman
 Mark Blount, NBA basketball player; transferred to Oak Hill Academy
 Con Chellis, insurance agent and politician
 Jenn Colella, comedian, actress, and singer
 Janet Cone, college athletic director for the UNC Asheville Bulldogs
 Sam Esmail, moved before graduation; television producer known for Mr. Robot and Homecoming
 Dustin Fry, NFL center
Gil Gatch, attorney, politician, and former pastor
 Kelontae Gavin, American gospel singer and worship leader
 A. J. Green, NFL two-time All-Pro wide receiver, seven-time Pro Bowl selection with the Cincinnati Bengals
 Shanola Hampton, actress
 De'Angelo Henderson, NFL running back
 Steven Jackson, MLB pitcher
 Keith Jennings, NFL tight end
 Stanford Jennings, NFL running back
 Kevin Long, NFL center
 Louis Mulkey, Charleston firefighter, one of the "Charleston Nine"
 Jamar Nesbit, NFL offensive guard, Super Bowl XLIV champion with the New Orleans Saints
 Carvin Nkanata, American-born Kenyan athlete specializing in the sprinting events
 Chase Page, NFL defensive tackle
 Ian Rafferty, NFL offensive lineman

References

External links 
 Official webpage

Public high schools in South Carolina
Schools in Dorchester County, South Carolina
1924 establishments in South Carolina
Educational institutions established in 1924